Kodigenahalli is a census town in Tumkur district in the Indian state of Karnataka.

Geography
It has an average elevation of 668 metres (2191 feet).

Demographics
 India census, Kodigenahalli had a population of 5448. Males constitute 51% of the population and females 49%. Kodigenahalli has an average literacy rate of 48%, lower than the national average of 59.5%: male literacy is 55%, and female literacy is 40%. In Kodigenahalli, 15% of the population is under 6 years of age.

References

Cities and towns in Tumkur district